BBP may refer to:

Science 

Bailey–Borwein–Plouffe formula, a formula for computing the nth binary digit of pi
Baseband processor, a device in a network interface that manages all the radio functions
Benzyl butyl phthalate, a plasticizer
Bloodborne pathogens, a virus that can be spread through contamination by blood and other body fluids
Branchpoint Binding Protein, a pre-mRNA processing factor involved in RNA splicing
Blue Brain Project, a Swiss brain research initiative that aims to create a digital reconstruction of rodent and eventually human brains

Places 

Bayport-Blue Point School District, a school district in Bayport and Blue Point, New York
Bembridge Airport, Isle of Wight, England (IATA airport code: BBP)
Brooklyn Bridge Park, a park on the Brooklyn side of the East River in New York City

Other 

Bayou Bridge Pipeline, an oil pipeline constructed from 2017 to 2019 in Louisiana that was the subject of protests due to its environmental impact
Best Business Practice, a method or technique that has consistently shown results superior to those achieved with other means, and that is used as a benchmark
Binibining Pilipinas, a Filipino beauty pageant
Bobby's Burger Palace, a group of fast casual restaurants which opened in July 2008 in Lake Grove, New York
"Boom Boom Pow", a 2009 song by The Black Eyed Peas
British Bangladeshi Power 100, an annual publication listing the 100 leading British Bangladeshi figures
Great Union Party (Turkish: Büyük Birlik Partisi), an extreme far-right nationalist political party in Turkey